Nawab Muhammad Said Khan Bahadur (19 May 1786 – 1 April 1855) was Nawab of Rampur from 1840 to 1855, succeeding his cousin Ahmad Ali Khan Bahadur. The son of Ghulam Muhammad Khan Bahadur, Muhammad Said spent his early years in the service of the East India Company, eventually rising to the rank of Deputy Collector for Dudain.  Although his father had been a tyrant during his brief reign, Muhammad Said by contrast proved to be a benevolent and progressive ruler, building irrigation works and establishing courts of law and an advanced legal code. Muhammad Said died on 1 April 1855 in his 69th year and was buried at Rampur. He was succeeded by his eldest son, Yusef Ali Khan Bahadur.

Reign  
During his reign, Muhammad Said Khan further organised the Rampur Library. He appointed Allam Yusuf Ali Khan Mehvi into a famous Kutub Khana. He invited accomplished calligraphers, illuminators and binders from Kashmir and other parts of India.And prepared a seal with the following Persian inscription:
Hast in muhr bar kutub khana  Wali-i-Rampur Farzana  AH 1268 (1852 A.D)

Cultural Depictions

References

Nawabs of Rampur
Nawabs of India
Indian Sunni Muslims
1786 births
1855 deaths